Flag (stylized in all caps) is a 13-episode Japanese mecha-genre anime television series created and directed by veteran director Ryōsuke Takahashi. It was broadcast as pay per view streaming web video on Bandai Channel starting on June 6, 2006. Episodes 1 and 2 were scheduled to be broadcast on the anime PPV channel SKY Perfect Perfect Choice ch. 160 Anime from August 18, 2006. Stylistically, the series makes use of a still and video cameraman POV, as well as "web cam" images, to create a documentary-like narrative, despite being an animated drama. Character design is by Kazuyoshi Takeuchi and mecha design is by Kazutaka Miyatake.

Setting
Saeko Shirasu is a 25-year-old war front-line photo-journalist who became a celebrity after taking a picture of civilians raising a makeshift UN flag in war-torn Uddiyana. The image then became an instant symbol for peace. However, just before the peace agreement is achieved, the flag was stolen by an armed extremist group in order to obstruct the truce. The UN peacekeepers decide to covertly send in a SDC (pronounced as "Seedac"—Special Development Command) unit to retrieve the flag. Because of her connection with the "Flag" photo, Saeko Shirasu was offered the job of following the SDC unit as a front line journalist. Among the SDC unit's equipment is the HAVWC (High Agility Versatile Weapon Carrier—pronounced "havoc") mecha armored vehicle.

Characters
 Shirasu's Front
 Saeko Shirasu—25-year-old frontline war photo-journalist
 SDC Unit
 Capt. Chris Eversalt—female commanding officer of the SDC unit, HAVWC mecha pilot
 2nd Lt. Nadi Olowokandi—transport and scout helicopter pilot
 2nd Lt. Hakan Aqbal—transport helicopter pilot
 1st Lt. Rowell Su-Ming—intelligence officer
 1st Lt. Jan Nikkanen—back-up pilot and intelligence support officer
 1st Lt. Christian Beroqui—engineer and mechanic, technical support
 1st Lt. Shin Ichiyanagi—HAVWC mecha pilot
 Akagi's Front
 Keiichi Akagi—Saeko's senpai (senior) and friend. Veteran cameraman working for the photo agency "Horizont".
 Lisa—Fellow journalist
 Naraya—Akagi's local informant

Episodes

References

Further reading

External links
 Official site 
 Bandai Channel Official site 
 

Anime with original screenplays
Aniplex
Bandai Entertainment anime titles
HJ Bunko
Mecha anime and manga
Military anime and manga